The Stubenberg Castle is a historical monument in Săcueni, Bihor, Romania. Construction of the castle began in the late 18th century and was finalized by the beginning of the 19th century.

The castle originally belonged to the Habsburg Royal House, who offered it to J. Dietrichstein, counselor to the Austro-Hungarian Empire.
In 1830 it was sold to the Stubenberg family.

Presently it belongs to the Romanian State. It used to function as the "Petõfi Sándor" Highschool until 2008.

See also 
 List of castles in Romania
 Tourism in Romania
 Săcueni

References

External links 
 Information and images at Locuri din Romania
 Information and history of the Stubenberg Castle

Castles in Romania
Historic monuments in Bihor County
Buildings and structures in Bihor County